Rosalie Mansion is a historic pre-Civil War mansion and historic house museum in Natchez, Mississippi.  Built in 1823, it served as the architectural inspiration for a large number of Natchez's grand Greek Revival mansions, and was a major influence on Antebellum architecture in the greater region.  During the American Civil War, it served as Union headquarters for the Natchez area from July 1863 on.  It was designated a National Historic Landmark in 1989.

Description
Rosalie is located southwest of Natchez's downtown area, overlooking the Mississippi River at the junction of Orleans and South Broadway Streets.  It is a basically cubical three-story brick building, with a truncated hip roof encircled by a low balustrade.  Its front facade has a monumental four-column Tuscan portico, with entablature and a gabled pediment with a semi-oval window at its center.  Broad entrances in the center bay provide access to the house on the ground floor and a balcony on the second; both have double-leaf doors, sidelight windows, and semi-oval transom windows.  A five-column portico extends across the center of the rear elevation, although it is covered by a flat roof without entablature.

History

Rosalie Mansion was built for Peter Little, a wealthy cotton broker, in 1823 on the bluff overlooking the Mississippi River. It is on a portion of the site of the Natchez Indians' 1729 massacre of the French at Fort Rosalie.
  
On July 13, 1863, a week after the Battle of Vicksburg, General Grant took possession of Rosalie to use as Union Army headquarters. On August 26, 1863, General Walter Gresham took command of Union Army troops at Natchez. His headquarters remained at Rosalie.

Gresham had much of the owner's furnishings stored in the attic and put under guard to prevent theft or destruction.  Union army tents covered much of the property surrounding the mansion. Union Army soldiers were placed in position in the widow's walk on top of the mansion.

Historic house museum
Rosalie Mansion has been owned, operated, and maintained as a historic house museum by the Mississippi State Society Daughters of the American Revolution, for more than seventy years.

It was declared a National Historic Landmark in 1989. Photography is not allowed inside the mansion.

Gallery

See also

National Register of Historic Places listings in Adams County, Mississippi

References

External links 
 Rosalie Mansion website
 U. S. Dept. of the Interior, Historic American Buildings Survey report, photos, and detailed floor plans of Rosalie, 1934

Museums in Natchez, Mississippi
Plantation houses in Mississippi
Historic house museums in Mississippi
American Civil War museums in Mississippi
1820s architecture in the United States
National Historic Landmarks in Mississippi
Antebellum architecture
Greek Revival houses in Mississippi
Houses in Natchez, Mississippi
National Register of Historic Places in Natchez, Mississippi
Individually listed contributing properties to historic districts on the National Register in Mississippi
1823 establishments in Mississippi
Houses completed in 1823